Ødbert E. Bjarnholt (24 December 1885 – 3 January 1946) was a Danish footballer. He played in one match for the Denmark national football team in 1914.

References

External links
 

1885 births
1946 deaths
Danish men's footballers
Denmark international footballers
Footballers from Copenhagen
Association football defenders
Boldklubben Frem players